Ratanpur was historical capital of Chhattisgarh until British takeover of Central Province from Maratha. Ratanpur is a town and a nagar palika in Bilaspur district in the Indian state of Chhattisgarh.

History 
Ratanpura, originally known as Ratnapura, was the capital of Kalachuris of Ratnapura, who were a branch of the Kalachuris of Tripuri. According to the 1114 CE Ratanpur inscription of the local king Jajjaladeva I, his ancestor Kalingaraja conquered Dakshina Kosala region, and made Tummana (modern Tuman) his capital. Kalingaraja's grandson Ratnaraja established Ratnapura (modern Ratanpur).

In 1407, the Kingdom of Ratanpur was divided into two parts, with its junior branch ruling from Raipur. It continued as the capital of Haihaiyavansi Kingdom until the 18th century, when it ruled large areas of Chhattisgarh, until the area passed to the control of the Bhosle and later the British.

British India controlled Ratanpur from Bilaspur which was part of The Central Provinces. The Central Provinces covered part of Chhattisgarh and Maharashtra states and its capital was Nagpur. It became the Central Provinces and Berar in 1903.

After independence of India, Ratanpur became part of Madhya Pradesh with Bhopal as its capital. On formation of Chhattisgarh state the capital city of Chhattisgarh shifted to Raipur.

Demographics 
 India census, Ratanpur had a population of 19,838. Males constituted 51% of the population and females 49%. Ratanpur has an average literacy rate of 59%, lower than the national average of 59.5% while male literacy is 70% and female literacy is 47%. In Ratanpur, 17% of the population is under 6 years of age.

Culture and religion 
The town is popular as a religious center and many Hindu devotees come here to offer their prayers and seek the blessings at the Mahamaya Temple, goddess Mahamaya also known as Kosaleswari, as she was presiding deity of Dakshin Kosal (modern Chhattisgarh).
 
Many other temples such as Bhudha Mahadev and Ramtekri are also situated there.

Transport 

Air 
Air travel is also accessible from Bilaspur. The Bilaspur Airport was inaugurated in March 2021 . There are direct flights from Bilaspur to Jabalpur, Delhi and Prayagraj.

References 

Cities and towns in Bilaspur district, Chhattisgarh
Former capital cities in India